Bubong (부봉 / 釜峰) is a mountain of South Korea. It has an elevation of 917 metres

See also
List of mountains of Korea

References

Mountains of South Korea